Sukhna Wildlife Sanctuary is located in Sivalik Hills of Chandigarh city, near Sukhna Lake. It was declared a wildlife sanctuary in 1998. Closed during rainy season. Pass is required to visit which is issued by Forest Department Office, Sec-19B, Chandigarh.

Area and location
The Sukhna Wildlife Sanctuary is a protected wildlife sanctuary. It is just 2 kilometers from the Sukhna Lake. It has been spread over an area of 26 square kilometres ( 2600 hectares ) of forest land spanning the plains at the foot of the Shivalik Hills. The rain-fed catchment region of the Sukhna Lake partly falls in the area designated for the Wildlife Sanctuary.

History
The history of the Sukhna Lake and the Sukhna Wildlife Sanctuary is intertwined. The Sukhna Lake was part of the development plans of the city of Chandigarh and was planned and built from 1958, through the sixties and seventies. It was an artificial lake that was fed with rain water from the catchment areas in the Shivalik Hills. Siltation was a big problem for the Sukhna Lake that had to be tackled and it was minimized by many engineering and soil conservation methods. A large scale afforestation program was taken up in the catchment area.

Flora and fauna
Although the Sukhna Wildlife Sanctuary was formally declared as a protected wildlife sanctuary in March 1998 yet this semi hilly area was already under adequate forest cover. After 1998 more systematic and a large scale afforestation program was taken up in the catchment areas that resulted in a further better forest cover developed in the catchment area. The deep forest area that grew in size over five decades became the home to a large variety of animals and plants. This forest was then designated as a protected sanctuary; Sukhna Wildlife Sanctuary Sukhna Wildlife Sanctuary has a rich variety of flora and fauna. It is known to have the most number of sambar found in a group or cluster than anywhere else in the country. It is home of a large number of birds and reptiles also which include jungle fowl, various sparrows.
The sanctuary contains various variety of trees, shrubs, herbs, grasses and climbers which include Acacia catechu (Khair), Acacia Arabica (Kikar), Dalbergia sisoo (Shisham), Anogeissus latifolia (Chhal), Azadirachta indica (Neem), Butea frondosa (Dhakk).

Gallery

Images presenting Inner view of Sukhna Wildlife Sanctuary also known as Nature trail reserve forest (as on 8 March 2020 )

References

External links

Wildlife sanctuaries in Chandigarh
Protected areas established in 1998
1998 establishments in Chandigarh